Bruce Hodgetts (born 25 January 1947) is an Australian former cricketer. He played five first-class matches for Tasmania between 1969 and 1972.

See also
 List of Tasmanian representative cricketers

References

External links
 

1947 births
Living people
Australian cricketers
Tasmania cricketers
Cricketers from Tasmania